Nationality words link to articles with information on the nation's poetry or literature (for instance, Irish or France).

Events

Works published

Colonial America
 John Armstrong, The Art of Preserving Health
 Mather Byles, Poems on Several Occasions, 31 poems written since 1727; he wrote a range of poetic forms in formal, neoclassical verse influenced by Alexander Pope
 James Logan, Cicero's Cato Major, a verse translation
 Jane Turell, Memoirs, a collection of pious poems already published as Reliquiae Turellae together with secular verses (posthumous)

United Kingdom

 Anonymous, Tommy Thumb's Pretty Song Book, the first extant collection of nursery rhymes
 Mark Akenside:
 The Pleasures of the Imagination, a long, didactic, enormously popular poem that remained in print through most of the century (revised 1757)
 An Epistle to Curio, published anonymously in November; "Curio" is William Pulteney, Earl of Bath
 John Armstrong, The Art of Preserving Health
 Jane Brereton, Poems on Several Occasions, the book states it was published this year, but it may have been published in January 1745, according to The Concise Oxford Chronology of English Literature
 Henry Brooke, see Edward Moore, below
 Edward Moore and Henry Brooke, Fables for the Female Sex, published anonymously; Henry Brooke wrote the last three fables
 Samuel Johnson:
 editor, An Account of the Life of John Philip Barretier, on the late poet, compiled by Johnson from François Baratier's letters; published anonymously
 An Account of the Life of Mr Richard Savage, on the late poet; the first major biography published by Johnson; published anonymously
 Joseph Warton, Enthusiast; or, The Lover of Nature, published anonymously on March 8
 John Wesley and Charles Wesley, A Collection of Psalms and Hymns
 Paul Whitehead, The Gymnasiad; or, Boxing Match

Births
Death years link to the corresponding "[year] in poetry" article:
 July 19 – Heinrich Christian Boie (died 1806), German author and poet
 August 25 – Johann Gottfried Herder (died 1803), German philosopher, poet, and literary critic
 November 26 – Karl Siegmund von Seckendorff (1785), German
 November 30 – Karl Ludwig von Knebel (died 1834), German poet and translator
Also:
 Werner Hans Frederik Abrahamson (died 1812), Danish

Deaths
Death years link to the corresponding "[year] in poetry" article:
 April 27 – James Miller (born 1704), English playwright, poet and satirist
 May 30 – Alexander Pope (born 1688), 56, English poet
 September 18 – Lewis Theobald (born 1688), English poet, playwright, translator and editor of Shakespeare

See also

 Poetry
 List of years in poetry
 List of years in literature
 18th century in poetry
 18th century in literature
 Augustan poetry
 Scriblerus Club

Notes

18th-century poetry
Poetry